This is a list of all 351 songs from the Dance Praise series, including  songs from the iOS and two computer video games as well as the free add-on and all expansion packs.  Note that the iOS version of Dance Praise cannot be expanded beyond the 15 songs included with the game.  Another 51 songs are exclusive to VeggieTales Dance Dance Dance; officially, they cannot be added to Dance Praise-branded games, and songs from such games cannot be added to VeggieTales.

Dance Praise
Officially, 351 songs have been released for Original Dance Praise, Dance Praise Party and Dance Praise 2: The ReMix.  Of these, 15 songs were included in the iOS version of Dance Praise.  These songs have a green check mark in the "iOS song" row.

VeggieTales Dance Dance Dance
VeggieTales Dance Dance Dance is a spin-off of the original Dance Praise video game, created by Digital Praise in partnership with Big Idea Entertainment.  The game includes 51 different songs from VeggieTales, with no official method of adding new songs:

 Bellybutton
 Big Things Too
 Billy Joe McGuffrey (Theatrical Version)
 B-O-N-G-O
 Boids
 The Bunny Song
 The Dance Of The Cucumber
 Do The Moo Shoo
 Driving Medley
 Endangered Love
 Erie Canal
 Ezekiel Saw The Wheel
 Gated Community
 Get On Board
 Good Shepherd (Psalm 23)
 Head, Shoulders, Knees and Toes (Do Your Ears Hang Low?)
 The Hairbrush Song
 His Cheeseburger
 I Can Be Your Friend
 I Love My Duck
 I'm So Blue
 John Jimmy Jingleheimer Schmidt
 Joshua Fought The Battle Of Jericho
 Joy to the World
 King Jesus Is All
 Larry's High Silk Hat 
 Love My Lips
 Modern Major General
 Polly Wolly Doodle
 Promised Land
 The Pirates Who Don't Do Anything
 Rocka My Soul
 Salesmunz Rap
 Schoolhouse Polka
 Silly Song Remix Medley
 Sports Utility Vehicle
 The Song Of The Cebu
 Take Me Out to the Ball Game (Backyard)
 The Thankfulness Song
 The Green Grass Grew All Around
 There's A Hole In The Bottom Of The Sea
 This Is My Commandment
 This Little Light of Mine
 VeggieTales Theme Song
 What Do You Do (With A Tired Veggie?)
 The Water Buffalo Song
 When the Saints Go Marching In
 While By My Sheep
 Who Did (Swallow Jonah)
 The Yodeling Veterinarian Of The Alps
 Zacchaeus

See also
 Dance Praise series
 Dance Praise video game
 Dance Praise 2: The ReMix

Notes

References

Dance Praise